Arctostaphylos nortensis, common name Del Norte manzanita, is a shrub narrowly endemic to the mountains along the Oregon/California state line. It has been reported from only 3 counties: Del Norte County, California; and Curry and Josephine Counties in Oregon.

Description
It is distinguished from other species in the region by the long hairs on its twigs, flowers and fruits.

References

External links
Calflora: Arctostaphylos nortensis (Del Norte manzanita)
Jepson eFlora (TJM2) treatment of Arctostaphylos nortensis
USDA Plants Profile for Arctostaphylos nortensis (Del Norte manzanita)

nortensis
Flora of California
Flora of the Klamath Mountains
Flora of Oregon
Natural history of the California chaparral and woodlands
Flora without expected TNC conservation status